Ian Francis Hamilton (born June 16, 1995) is an American professional baseball pitcher in the New York Yankees organization. He has previously played in Major League Baseball (MLB) for the Chicago White Sox and Minnesota Twins.

Career

Amateur
Hamilton attended Skyview High School in Vancouver, Washington, and Washington State University, where he played college baseball for the Washington State Cougars. He was Washington State's closer his first two years before converting into a starting pitcher as a junior. In 2015, he played collegiate summer baseball with the Wareham Gatemen of the Cape Cod Baseball League, and was West division most valuable player of the league's all-star game.

Chicago White Sox
The Chicago White Sox selected Hamilton in the 11th round of the 2016 Major League Baseball Draft and he signed. Hamilton made his professional debut with the Arizona League White Sox and after one game was promoted to the Kannapolis Intimidators, where he spent the remainder of the season, going 1–1 with a 3.69 ERA in  relief innings pitched. He pitched in 2017 for the Winston-Salem Dash and Birmingham Barons, pitching to a combined 4–6 record and 2.64 ERA in 44 relief appearances, and started 2018 with Birmingham before being promoted to the Charlotte Knights. 

Hamilton was promoted to the major leagues on August 31, 2018. Hamilton opened the 2019 season on the injured list with right shoulder inflammation, which stemmed from a minor car accident. When he returned, he was optioned to Charlotte. On June 28, the White Sox announced that Hamilton would miss the rest of the 2019 season after being struck in the face with a batted ball. He suffered multiple facial fractures and lost teeth which required multiple surgeries to repair.

On September 18, 2020, Hamilton was designated for assignment by the White Sox. Hamilton was claimed off waivers by the Seattle Mariners on September 25, and was claimed off waivers by the Philadelphia Phillies on December 7. On January 29, 2021, Hamilton was designated for assignment by the Phillies.

Minnesota Twins
On February 5, 2021, the Minnesota Twins claimed Hamilton off waivers. On February 12, 2021, Hamilton was designated for assignment following the signing of Alex Colomé. He had his contract selected on June 3. He was returned to Triple-A on June 6.

Cleveland Guardians
On August 2, 2022, the Twins traded Hamilton to the Cleveland Guardians in exchange for Sandy León. He spent the remainder of the season with the Triple-A Columbus Clippers, but struggled to an 0–4 record and 6.27 ERA with 24 strikeouts in  innings pitched across 15 appearances for the team. Hamilton elected minor league free agency on November 10, 2022.

New York Yankees
On February 3, 2023, Hamilton signed a minor league contract with the New York Yankees organization.

References

External links

1995 births
Living people
People from Dover, New Hampshire
Sportspeople from Strafford County, New Hampshire
Baseball players from New Hampshire
Major League Baseball pitchers
Chicago White Sox players
Minnesota Twins players
Washington State Cougars baseball players
Wareham Gatemen players
Arizona League White Sox players
Kannapolis Intimidators players
Winston-Salem Dash players
Birmingham Barons players
Charlotte Knights players
St. Paul Saints players